Shippen House is a historic home located at Shippensburg in Cumberland County, Pennsylvania. It is a large 2½-story, limestone building, built in three phases.

History
The oldest section of the house was built in about 1750. It measured 28 feet wide and 32 feet deep. The original house was built by Edward Shippen, III (1703-1781), who laid out Shippensburg and occupied the house on periodic visits to his trading companies.

This is where Anne Shippen was born in 1763 where her parents William and Alice Shippen lived. William Shippen lectured in anatomy and midwifery in a lecture theater which was just by the house.

Anne Shippen returned as Mrs Livingston after her arranged marriage failed by 1783 and she then started a journal. A two-bay addition was built in 1785, and a two-story, brick rear addition was built in 1935 as part of a major restoration effort.  A classical porch was also added in 1935.

It was listed on the National Register of Historic Places in 1975.  It is located in the Shippensburg Historic District.

References 

Houses on the National Register of Historic Places in Pennsylvania
Houses completed in 1750
Houses in Cumberland County, Pennsylvania
National Register of Historic Places in Cumberland County, Pennsylvania